Tyrone Anthony Taylor (born January 22, 1994) is an American professional baseball outfielder for the Milwaukee Brewers of Major League Baseball (MLB).

Amateur career
Taylor was drafted by the Milwaukee Brewers in the second round of the 2012 Major League Baseball draft out of Torrance High School in Torrance, California. He had signed to play college baseball at California State University, Fullerton, but signed with the Brewers instead.

Professional career
Taylor made his professional debut that year for the Helena Brewers and also played for the Arizona League Brewers. In 75 at-bats over 18 games, he hit .387/.434/.667 with two home runs. He played the 2013 season with the Wisconsin Timber Rattlers. In 122 games, he hit .274/.338/.400 with eight home runs in 485 at-bats. Prior to the 2014 season, he was ranked by Baseball America as the Brewers second best prospect. He started the season with the Brevard County Manatees. On April 29, 2014, Tyrone Taylor hit for the cycle against the Clearwater Threshers on his mother's 35th birthday. It was the first cycle in Brevard County Manatees history. He split the 2014 season between the Brevard County Manatees and the Huntsville Stars, hitting .273/.326/.388/.714 with 6 home runs and 68 RBI. He spent the 2015 season with the Biloxi Shuckers, hitting .260/.312/.337/.649 with 3 home runs and 43 RBI. He returned to Biloxi for the 2016 season, hitting .232/.303/.327/.630 with 9 home runs and 34 RBI. He split the 2017 season between the AZL Brewers and Biloxi, hitting .287/.355/.509/.864 with 5 home runs and 13 RBI over just 25 games due to hamstring injuries. He played for the Colorado Springs Sky Sox in 2018, hitting .278/.321/.504/.825 with 20 home runs and 80 RBI. The Brewers added him to their 40-man roster after the 2018 offseason. He split the 2019 minor league season between the AZL Brewers and the San Antonio Missions, hitting .275/.342/.462/.804 with 14 home runs and 59 RBI.

On September 7, 2019, the Brewers promoted Taylor to the major leagues. He made his major league debut that night. Taylor appeared in 22 games for the Brewers in 2020, hitting .237/.293/.500 with 2 home runs and 6 RBI in 38 at-bats. 

Taylor appeared in 93 games for the Brewers in 2021, hitting .247/.321/.457 with 12 home runs, 43 RBI, and 6 stolen bases. In 2022, Taylor hit .233/.286/.442 with 17 home runs and 51 RBI in 405 plate appearances across 120 games.

During spring training in 2023, Taylor was kept out after his recovery from a right elbow sprain suffered in the previous year went slower than hoped. On March 1, 2023, it was announced that Taylor had received a platelet-rich plasma injection in his right elbow and would miss the first month of the season.

References

External links

Roache, Taylor giving Brewers plenty to smile about

1994 births
Living people
Baseball players from Torrance, California
Major League Baseball outfielders
Milwaukee Brewers players
Arizona League Brewers players
Helena Brewers players
Wisconsin Timber Rattlers players
Brevard County Manatees players
Huntsville Stars players
Glendale Desert Dogs players
Biloxi Shuckers players
Colorado Springs Sky Sox players
San Antonio Missions players
Nashville Sounds players